Ashleigh is the feminine form of the Old English name Ashley, which means "dweller near the ash tree forest". It is most common in the United States and United Kingdom.

Notable people

B
Ashleigh Ball (born 1983), Canadian voice actress
Ashleigh Ball (field hockey) (born 1986), British field hockey player
Ashleigh Banfield (born 1967), Canadian-American journalist
Ashleigh Barty (born 1996), Australian tennis player
Ashleigh Baxter (born 1991), Irish rugby union footballer
Ashleigh Brazill (born 1989), Australian netball player
Ashleigh Brennan (born 1991), Australian gymnast
Ashleigh Brewer (born 1990), Australian actress
Ashleigh Brilliant (born 1933), English author
Ashleigh Buch (born 1984), American soldier
Ashleigh Buhai (born 1989), South African golfer

C
Ashleigh Clare-Kearney (born 1986), American gymnast
Ashleigh Connor (1989–2011), Australian footballer
Ashleigh Cummings (born 1992), Australian actress

D
Ashleigh Dallas (born 1994), Australian singer-songwriter

F
Ashleigh Francis (born 1988), Australian model

G
Ashleigh Gardner (born 1997), Australian cricketer
Ashleigh Gillon, Australian journalist
Ashleigh Gnat (born 1994), American gymnast
Ashleigh Gray, Scottish actress
Ashleigh Guest (born 1990), Australian rules footballer
Ashleigh Gunning (born 1985), American soccer player

H
Ashleigh Harrington (born 1989), Canadian actress
Ashleigh Hewson (born 1979), Australian rugby union footballer

I
Ashleigh Isenbarger (born 1997), Australian basketball player

J
Ashleigh Johnson (born 1994), American water polo player

K
Ashleigh Karaitiana (born 1992), New Zealand-Australian basketball player

L
Ashleigh Lynch (born 1990), English cricketer

M
Ashleigh McConnell (born 1996), Australian Paralympic swimmer
Ashleigh McIvor (born 1983), Canadian skier
Ashleigh Moolman (born 1985), South African cyclist
Ashleigh Aston Moore (1981–2007), Canadian actress
Ashleigh Murray (born 1988), American actress

N
Ashleigh Nelson (disambiguation), multiple people
Ashleigh Neville (born 1993), English footballer

P
Ashleigh Pilbrow (1912–1995), English athlete
Ashleigh Fay Pittaway (born 2000), German-British skeleton racer
Ashleigh Plumptre (born 1998), English footballer

R
Ashleigh Rainey, Northern Irish lawn bowler
Ashleigh Riddell (born 1996), Australian rules footballer
Ashleigh Rondón (born 1998), American soccer player
Ashleigh Shelby Rosette, American academic administrator
Ashleigh Ross (born 2000), Australian actress

S
Ashleigh Shanti (born 1991), American chef
Ashleigh Shim (born 1993), Jamaican footballer
Ashleigh Southern (born 1992), Australian water polo player
Ashleigh Spencer (born 1992), Australian basketball player
Ashleigh Sykes (born 1991), Australian footballer

U
Ashleigh Udalovas (born 1988), American model

V
Ashleigh Vaughn (born 1999), South African water polo player

W
Ashleigh Ward (born 1994), New Zealand footballer
Ashleigh Weerden (born 1999), Dutch footballer
Ashleigh Whiffin, English entomologist
Ashleigh Whitfield (born 1980), British broadcaster
Ashleigh Woodland (born 1998), Australian rules footballer

Y
Ashleigh Young (born 1983), New Zealand poet

Notable people with "Ashleigh" surname
Charles Ashleigh (1892–1974), English activist
Dave Ashleigh (born 1943), American water polo player

Notes

English given names